John Vickery (born 6 July 1951) is a former Australian rules footballer who played with Collingwood in the Victorian Football League (VFL). He is the father of former Richmond and Hawthorn footballer Ty Vickery.

Notes

External links 

1951 births
Living people
Australian rules footballers from Victoria (Australia)
Collingwood Football Club players
Coleraine Football Club players